Montana Highway 77 (MT 77), also known as Hot Springs Road, is an approximately  state highway in the west of the US state of Montana, and it is a spur route to connect MT 28 to the city of Hot Springs. The entire route is within the Flathead Indian Reservation.

Route description
MT 77 begins at the intersection with MT 28, and proceeds due west until reaching the Hot Springs city limits, where Hot Springs Road becomes Broadway Avenue.

History
Hot Springs Road was created in order to link the community with MT 28, when it was rerouted to the east of the city circa 1939, as seen on the 1940 state map. The 1942 road log refers to it simply as the "Hot Springs Spur" under Federal Aid Primary Route 36 (the official state designation for MT 28, which is still used today).

The highway was designated MT 77 on July 1, 1976, and appears in the 1978 road log as Primary Route 77. And even though the route number is not shown on the state map, one can see it change from the generic solid black used for secondary paved roads on the 1977 map to the solid red used for primary paved roads on the 1978 edition.

The highway is now part of the state's "off-system" routes, designated with a primary route number but not listed in the most recent (2013) road log. (See MT 38 and MT 49 for two other examples.)

Major intersections

See also

References

External links

077
Transportation in Sanders County, Montana